In mathematics and computing, universal hashing (in a randomized algorithm or data structure) refers to selecting a hash function at random from a family of hash functions with a certain mathematical property (see definition below). This guarantees a low number of collisions in expectation, even if the data is chosen by an adversary. Many universal families are known (for hashing integers, vectors, strings), and their evaluation is often very efficient. Universal hashing has numerous uses in computer science, for example in implementations of hash tables, randomized algorithms, and cryptography.

Introduction 

Assume we want to map keys from some universe  into  bins (labelled ). The algorithm will have to handle some data set  of  keys, which is not known in advance. Usually, the goal of hashing is to obtain a low number of collisions (keys from  that land in the same bin). A deterministic hash function cannot offer any guarantee in an adversarial setting if , since the adversary may choose  to be precisely the preimage of a bin. This means that all data keys land in the same bin, making hashing useless. Furthermore, a deterministic hash function does not allow for rehashing: sometimes the input data turns out to be bad for the hash function (e.g. there are too many collisions), so one would like to change the hash function.

The solution to these problems is to pick a function randomly from a family of hash functions. A family of functions  is called a universal family if, .

This is exactly the probability of collision we would expect if the hash function assigned truly random hash codes to every key. 

So for example, a universal family has -almost universality.

Many, but not all, universal families have the following stronger uniform difference property:

Note that the definition of universality is only concerned with whether , which counts collisions. The uniform difference property is stronger.

(Similarly, a universal family can be XOR universal if , the value  is uniformly distributed in  where  is the bitwise exclusive or operation. This is only possible if  is a power of two.)

An even stronger condition is pairwise independence: we have this property when   we have the probability that  will hash to any pair of hash values  is as if they were perfectly random: . Pairwise independence is sometimes called strong universality.

Another property is uniformity. We say that a family is uniform if all hash values are equally likely:  for any hash value . Universality does not imply uniformity. However, strong  universality does imply uniformity.

(Similarly, if  is a power of two, we can achieve pairwise independence from an XOR universal hash family by doing an exclusive or with a uniformly distributed random constant.) Since a shift by a constant is sometimes irrelevant in applications (e.g. hash tables), a careful distinction between the uniform distance property and pairwise independent is sometimes not made.

For some applications (such as hash tables), it is important for the least significant bits of the hash values to be also universal. Unfortunately, the same is not true of (merely) universal families. For example, the family made of the identity function  is clearly universal, but the family made of the function  fails to be universal.

UMAC and Poly1305-AES and several other message authentication code algorithms are based on universal hashing.
In such applications, the software chooses a new hash function for every message, based on a unique nonce for that message.

Several hash table implementations are based on universal hashing.
In such applications, typically the software chooses a new hash function only after it notices that "too many" keys have collided; until then, the same hash function continues to be used over and over.
(Some collision resolution schemes, such as dynamic perfect hashing, pick a new hash function every time there is a collision. Other collision resolution schemes, such as cuckoo hashing and 2-choice hashing, allow a number of collisions before picking a new hash function). A survey of fastest known universal and strongly universal hash functions for integers, vectors, and
strings is found in.

Mathematical guarantees 

For any fixed set  of  keys, using a universal family guarantees the following properties.
When implementing hash tables by chaining, this number is proportional to the expected running time of an operation involving the key  (for example a query, insertion or deletion).
When hashing into  bins, there are no collisions at all with probability at least a half.
Thus, if the capacity of each bin is capped to three times the average size, the total number of keys in overflowing bins is at most .

As the above guarantees hold for any fixed set , they hold if the data set is chosen by an adversary. However, the adversary has to make this choice before (or independent of) the algorithm's random choice of a hash function. If the adversary can observe the random choice of the algorithm, randomness serves no purpose, and the situation is the same as deterministic hashing.

The second and third guarantee are typically used in conjunction with rehashing. For instance, a randomized algorithm may be prepared to handle some  number of collisions. If it observes too many collisions, it chooses another random  from the family and repeats. Universality guarantees that the number of repetitions is a geometric random variable.

Constructions 

Since any computer data can be represented as one or more machine words, one generally needs hash functions for three types of domains: machine words ("integers"); fixed-length vectors of machine words; and variable-length vectors ("strings").

Hashing integers 

This section refers to the case of hashing integers that fit in machines words; thus, operations like multiplication, addition, division, etc. are cheap machine-level instructions. Let the universe to be hashed be .

The original proposal of Carter and Wegman was to pick a prime  and define

 

(This is a single iteration of a linear congruential generator.)

To see that  is a universal family, note that  only holds when

 

Since , if  their difference  is nonzero and has an inverse modulo . Solving for  yields

 .

Thus the collision probability is
	 
 .

Another way to see  is a universal family is via the notion of statistical distance. Write the difference  as

 .

The family of simpler hash functions
 
is only approximately universal:  for all .  Moreover, this analysis is nearly tight; Carter and Wegman  show that  whenever .

Avoiding modular arithmetic 

The state of the art for hashing integers is the multiply-shift scheme described by Dietzfelbinger et al. in 1997. By avoiding modular arithmetic, this method is much easier to implement and also runs significantly faster in practice (usually by at least a factor of four). The scheme assumes the number of bins is a power of two, . Let  be the number of bits in a machine word. Then the hash functions are parametrised over odd positive integers  (that fit in a word of  bits). To evaluate , multiply  by  modulo  and then keep the high order  bits as the hash code. In mathematical notation, this is
 

This scheme does not satisfy the uniform difference property and is only -almost-universal; for any , .

To understand the behavior of the hash function, 
Assume that the least significant set bit of  appears on position . Since  is a random odd integer and odd integers have inverses in the ring , it follows that  will be uniformly distributed among -bit integers with the least significant set bit on position .  The probability that these bits are all 0's or all 1's is therefore at most .
On the other hand, if , then higher-order M bits of 
 contain both 0's and 1's, so 
it is certain that .  Finally, if  then bit  of 
 is 1 and  if and only if bits  are also 1, which happens with probability .

To obtain a truly 'universal' hash function, one can use the multiply-add-shift scheme that picks higher-order bits
 
This requires doing arithmetic on -bit unsigned integers.
This version of multiply-shift is due to Dietzfelbinger, and was later analyzed more precisely by Woelfel.

Hashing vectors 

This section is concerned with hashing a fixed-length vector of machine words. Interpret the input as a vector  of  machine words (integers of  bits each). If  is a universal family with the uniform difference property, the following family (dating back to Carter and Wegman) also has the uniform difference property (and hence is universal):

 , where each  is chosen independently at random.

If  is a power of two, one may replace summation by exclusive or.

In practice, if double-precision arithmetic is available, this is instantiated with the multiply-shift hash family of hash functions. Initialize the hash function with a vector  of random odd integers on  bits each.

 .

It is possible to halve the number of multiplications, which roughly translates to a two-fold speed-up in practice. Initialize the hash function with a vector  of random odd integers on  bits each. The following hash family is universal:
 .

If double-precision operations are not available, one can interpret the input as a vector of half-words (-bit integers). The algorithm will then use  multiplications, where  was the number of half-words in the vector. Thus, the algorithm runs at a "rate" of one multiplication per word of input.

The same scheme can also be used for hashing integers, by interpreting their bits as vectors of bytes. In this variant, the vector technique is known as tabulation hashing and it provides a practical alternative to multiplication-based universal hashing schemes.

Strong universality at high speed is also possible. Initialize the hash function with a vector  of random  integers on  bits. Compute

 .

The result is strongly universal on  bits.

Hashing strings 

This refers to hashing a variable-sized vector of machine words. If the length of the string can be bounded by a small number, it is best to use the vector solution from above (conceptually padding the vector with zeros up to the upper bound). As long as zeroes are forbidden in the string, the zero-padding can be ignored when evaluating the hash function without affecting universality. Note that if zeroes are allowed in the string, then it might be best to append a fictitious non-zero (e.g., 1) character to all strings prior to padding: this will ensure that universality is not affected.

A universal family proposed by  
treats the string  as the coefficients of a polynomial modulo a large prime. If , let  be a prime and define:

Using properties of modular arithmetic, above can be computed without producing large numbers for large strings as follows:

uint hash(String x, int a, int p)
	uint h = INITIAL_VALUE
	for (uint i=0 ; i < x.length ; ++i)
		h = ((h*a) + x[i]) mod p
	return h

This Rabin-Karp rolling hash is based on a linear congruential generator.
Above algorithm is also known as Multiplicative hash function. In practice, the mod operator and the parameter p can be avoided altogether by simply allowing integer to overflow because it is equivalent to mod (Max-Int-Value + 1) in many programming languages. Below table shows values chosen to initialize h and a for some of the popular implementations.

Consider two strings  and let  be length of the longer one; for the analysis, the shorter string is conceptually padded with zeros up to length . A collision before applying  implies that  is a root of the polynomial with coefficients . This polynomial has at most  roots modulo , so the collision probability is at most . Thus, if the prime  is sufficiently large compared to the length of strings hashed, the family is very close to universal (in statistical distance).

Other universal families of hash functions used to hash unknown-length strings to fixed-length hash values include the Rabin fingerprint and the Buzhash.

Avoiding modular arithmetic 

To mitigate the computational penalty of modular arithmetic, three tricks are used in practice:
 One chooses the prime  to be close to a power of two, such as a Mersenne prime. This allows arithmetic modulo  to be implemented without division (using faster operations like addition and shifts).
 One can apply vector hashing to blocks. For instance, one applies vector hashing to each 16-word block of the string, and applies string hashing to the  results. Since the slower string hashing is applied on a substantially smaller vector, this will essentially be as fast as vector hashing.
 One chooses a power-of-two as the divisor, allowing arithmetic modulo  to be implemented without division (using faster operations of bit masking). The NH hash-function family takes this approach.

See also
 K-independent hashing
 Rolling hashing
 Tabulation hashing
 Min-wise independence
 Universal one-way hash function
 Low-discrepancy sequence
 Perfect hashing

References

Further reading

External links
 Open Data Structures - Section 5.1.1 - Multiplicative Hashing, Pat Morin

Cryptographic hash functions
Hashing
Search algorithms
Computational complexity theory